Obed Lake Provincial Park  is a provincial park in Alberta, Canada, located  west of Edson and  east of Hinton, on the north side of the Yellowhead Highway.

The park surrounds the Obed Lakes.

Activities
The following activities are available in the park:

Camping
Canoeing and kayaking
Fishing (yellow perch, brown trout, sucker)
Power boating

See also
List of provincial parks in Alberta
List of Canadian provincial parks
List of National Parks of Canada

References

External links

Provincial parks of Alberta
Yellowhead County